Aashka Goradia is an Indian television actor and model. She has walked the ramp in several fashion events and has acted in various Hindi television serials. She became popular after portraying the role of Kumud in Kkusum and Kalavati in Laagi Tujhse Lagan. She also appeared in the television series Baal Veer and Naagin. Goradia also participated in reality shows like Fear Factor: Khatron Ke Khiladi, Bigg Boss and Nach Baliye. She was most recently seen playing the role of Saptroopa in Daayan.

Career 
Goradia started her career with Sony TV's Achanak 37 Saal Baad in 2002 and comedy sitcom Acting Acting. Soon after, she was signed on for Kkusum on Sony TV in which she played the role of Kumud. She then acted in another serial Akela which also aired on Sony TV. She also did a reality game show Jet Set Go on Star One but was replaced by Shama Sikander. She then played some roles in TV serials like Sinndoor Tere Naam Ka on Zee TV, Mere Apne on 9X and Virrudh on Sony TV. She was also seen as Kalika in Zee TV's Saat Phere, Sony TV's Shubh Vivah and Kalavati Laagi Tujhse Lagan on Colors TV, which were all negative characters.

Goradia has also participated in some reality shows like Kabhi Kabhii Pyaar Kabhi Kabhii Yaar, Mr. & Ms. TV and Khatron Ke Khiladi Season 4. In 2012, she participated as a contestant in the sixth season of Bigg Boss, the Indian version of the original UK show Big Brother entering the Bigg Boss house on 6 October 2012 and getting evicted on 28 December 2012 (on the 83rd day of the show). Slamming reality shows in an interview in 2018, she alleged that the producers had misreprented her as a lesbian on the show.

From 2013 to 2015, she played the role of Maharani Dheer Bai Bhatiyani in the television series Bharat Ka Veer Putra – Maharana Pratap on Sony TV. In August 2015, she played the evil fairy Mahavinashini on Sab TV's Baal Veer. She was then seen in the supernatural drama  Naagin from 2016 to 2017.

In 2017, she participated in the couple dance reality show Nach Baliye Season 8 on StarPlus with fiancé Brent Goble. First eliminated on 14 May, they as a wild card entry only to be eliminated again on 4 June.

She was most recently seen playing the role of Sapt-roopa on &TV's show Daayan.

Personal life

Aashka dated television actor Rohit Bakshi from 2006 to 2015. After her break-up, she started dating Brent Goble, an American businessman. Aashka married Brent on 1 December 2017 in a Christian wedding ceremony, followed with a traditional Hindu ceremony on 3 December 2017.

Trolled for undergoing a lip job in 2018, Aashka responded by opening up about the surgery and claiming that her choice to look better did not make her fake. Earlier the same year, she slammed the reality show Bigg Boss in an interview with actor and talkshow host Rajeev Khandelwal on his show Juzzbaatt for misrepresenting her as a lesbian by using editing tricks.

In 2018, she launched India's first double stitched 3D eyelashes under the brand Renee by Aashka named after her mother-in-law. She named the first products after close friends like actresses Juhi Parmar and Mouni Roy. She was also invited to be a speaker at a TED Talk later that year.

Television

References

External links 

 
 

Indian television actresses
Living people
Actresses from Ahmedabad
21st-century Indian actresses
Actresses in Hindi television
Bigg Boss (Hindi TV series) contestants
Year of birth missing (living people)
Fear Factor: Khatron Ke Khiladi participants